Oswald Samuel Konstantin Freiherr von Richthofen (13 October 1847, in Iași – 17 January 1906, in Berlin, Germany), a German diplomat and politician, served as Foreign Secretary and head of the Foreign Office from 23 October 1900 to 17 January 1906.

Background and career 

The son of diplomat Emil von Richthofen (1810–1895), he was born in Iaşi, where his father was Consul General. He joined the foreign service in 1875, and served in the Franco-Prussian War 1870–1871. From 1885 to 1896, he was stationed in Cairo. He served as Director of Colonial Affairs at the Foreign Office from 15 October 1896 to 31 March 1898. During his term as Director, the railway from Swakopmund to Windhoek in German South-West Africa was completed. A post office in the colony is named in his honour.

He was appointed Under-Secretary of Foreign Affairs in December 1897.

Secretary of Foreign Affairs 
Richthofen became Secretary on 23 October 1900, when he succeeded Bernhard von Bülow, who at the same time became Chancellor of Germany. He served as Secretary until his death in Berlin on 17 January 1906. He was also appointed Privy Councillor in 1901 and Minister of State of Prussia in 1905. On 24 January 1906, he was succeeded as Secretary by Heinrich Leonhard von Tschirschky und Bögendorff.

Distinctions
He received the following orders and decorations:
German orders and decorations

Foreign orders and decorations

References 

1847 births
1906 deaths
Diplomats from Iași
Foreign Secretaries of Germany
Politicians from Iași
Recipients of the Iron Cross (1870), 2nd class
Commandeurs of the Légion d'honneur
Knights Grand Cross of the Order of Saints Maurice and Lazarus
Grand Cordons of the Order of the Rising Sun
Grand Crosses of the Order of Christ (Portugal)
Recipients of the Order of the Medjidie, 1st class
Grand Crosses of the Order of the Crown (Romania)
Knights Grand Cross of the Order of Isabella the Catholic
Commanders Second Class of the Order of Vasa
Honorary Knights Grand Cross of the Royal Victorian Order
Politicians awarded knighthoods